Asalem Rural District is a rural district (dehestan) in Asalem District, Talesh County, Gilan Province, Iran. At the 2006 census, its population was 20,226, in 4,765 families. The rural district has 31 villages.

References 

Rural Districts of Gilan Province
Talesh County